A.C. Fiorentina had its first season under Swedish coach Sven-Göran Eriksson, posting a stable mid-table season. Eriksson's compatriot Glenn Hysén arrived from UEFA Cup champions IFK Göteborg, the centre half becoming a crucial player for La Viola. Starlet Roberto Baggio finally got his breakthrough, scoring six league goals.

Squad

Goalkeepers
  Paolo Conti
  Marco Landucci
  Alessandro Misefori

Defenders
  Stefano Carobbi
  Renzo Contratto
  Glenn Hysén
  Ernesto Calisti
  Celeste Pin
  Andrea Rocchigiani

Midfielders
  Simone Sereni
  Sergio Battistini
  Roberto Bosco
  Nicola Berti
  Roberto Onorati
  Roberto Gelsi
  Alberto Di Chiara

Attackers
  Paolo Ciucchi
  Roberto Baggio
  Fabio Graccaneli
  Ramón Díaz
  Davide Pellegrini
  Stefano Rebonato

Competitions

Serie A

League table

Matches

Coppa Italia

First round

Results

Round of 16

Statistics

Topscorers
  Ramón Díaz 12 (1)
  Roberto Baggio 9 (4)
  Davide Pellegrini 4
  Alberto Di Chiara 4

References

ACF Fiorentina seasons
Fiorentina